The Albany Masonic Hall, also known as Plantagenet Lodge, is a heritage listed building located at 58–60 Spencer Street, on the corner of Earl Street, on the south western slopes of Mount Clarence in Albany in the Great Southern region of Western Australia.

The Albany Lodge, the Lodge of St John, was the first Masonic lodge to erect a hall in Western Australia. It is also the only one still under the English Constitution. The land was bought  in 1872 for the sum of £30. The first hall was built on the site in 1873 but was demolished in 1903 to make way for the new hall. The first hall was  a tall and narrow building two storeys high. It faced on to Earl St with a door and two sash windows on the ground floor and three windows above. The first meeting was held there in 1873. The foundation stone was laid in July 1903, after the brethren met and marched from Scots Church to the site and then buried a phial containing a brief history of the lodge. 

The hall is situated on a  block. The building has an elevated position, has elements of a simple Federation Warehouse style, gable roof with freemason symbol on gable, arched windows on façade and emphasised piers with decorative top motifs.

See also
 List of places on the State Register of Heritage Places in the City of Albany

References

1903 establishments in Australia
Heritage places in Albany, Western Australia
Masonic buildings in Australia
State Register of Heritage Places in the City of Albany